Sabellian can refer to
Sabellian, a believer in Sabellianism, the nontrinitarian belief that the Father, Son and Holy Spirit are different modes or aspects of one God, rather than three distinct persons in God Himself
Sabellian languages, another name for the Osco-Umbrian languages
Sabellians a collective ethnonym for a group of Italic peoples or tribes inhabiting central Italy at the time of the rise of Rome